The 1975–76 Pittsburgh Penguins season was their ninth in the National Hockey League. They finished third in the Norris Division, as they had in 1974–75. Despite strong seasons by Pierre Larouche, who set new club records in goals scored in a season (53) and points in a season (111), Jean Pronovost and Syl Apps, Jr. (who set a new club record for assists in a season with 67) the Penguins powerful offense scored a meagre three goals in three games against the Toronto Maple Leafs in the preliminary round of the Stanley Cup playoffs, ending their season.

Regular season

Division standings

Schedule and results

|- style="background:#cfc;"
| 1 || Oct 7 || Pittsburgh Penguins || 4–2 || Washington Capitals || Capital Centre || 1–0–0 || 2
|- style="background:#cfc;"
| 2 || Oct 11 || Washington Capitals || 5–7 || Pittsburgh Penguins || Civic Arena || 2–0–0 || 4
|- style="background:#cfc;"
| 3 || Oct 15 || Pittsburgh Penguins || 8–4 || Toronto Maple Leafs || Maple Leaf Gardens || 3–0–0 || 6
|- style="background:#cfc;"
| 4 || Oct 18 || Detroit Red Wings || 1–6 || Pittsburgh Penguins || Civic Arena || 4–0–0 || 8
|- style="background:#fcf;"
| 5 || Oct 21 || Montreal Canadiens || 7–1 || Pittsburgh Penguins || Civic Arena || 4–1–0 || 8
|- style="background:#ffc;"
| 6 || Oct 25 || Philadelphia Flyers || 4–4 || Pittsburgh Penguins || Civic Arena || 4–1–1 || 9
|- style="background:#fcf;"
| 7 || Oct 30 || Pittsburgh Penguins || 0–4 || Los Angeles Kings || The Forum || 4–2–1 || 9
|-

|- style="background:#fcf;"
| 8 || Nov 1 || Pittsburgh Penguins || 3–7 || Minnesota North Stars || Met Center || 4–3–1 || 9
|- style="background:#fcf;"
| 9 || Nov 2 || Pittsburgh Penguins || 2–7 || Buffalo Sabres || Buffalo Memorial Auditorium || 4–4–1 || 9
|- style="background:#cfc;"
| 10 || Nov 5 || New York Islanders || 6–7 || Pittsburgh Penguins || Civic Arena || 5–4–1 || 11
|- style="background:#cfc;"
| 11 || Nov 6 || Pittsburgh Penguins || 5–3 || St. Louis Blues || St. Louis Arena || 6–4–1 || 13
|- style="background:#fcf;"
| 12 || Nov 8 || Chicago Black Hawks || 7–5 || Pittsburgh Penguins || Civic Arena || 6–5–1 || 13
|- style="background:#fcf;"
| 13 || Nov 9 || Pittsburgh Penguins || 4–6 || Philadelphia Flyers || The Spectrum || 6–6–1 || 13
|- style="background:#ffc;"
| 14 || Nov 12 || Pittsburgh Penguins || 6–6 || Washington Capitals || Capital Centre || 6–6–2 || 14
|- style="background:#fcf;"
| 15 || Nov 13 || Montreal Canadiens || 5–4 || Pittsburgh Penguins || Civic Arena || 6–7–2 || 14
|- style="background:#fcf;"
| 16 || Nov 15 || Buffalo Sabres || 5–2 || Pittsburgh Penguins || Civic Arena || 6–8–2 || 14
|- style="background:#fcf;"
| 17 || Nov 18 || California Golden Seals || 5–3 || Pittsburgh Penguins || Civic Arena || 6–9–2 || 14
|- style="background:#cfc;"
| 18 || Nov 21 || Pittsburgh Penguins || 4–1 || Atlanta Flames || Omni Coliseum || 7–9–2 || 16
|- style="background:#cfc;"
| 19 || Nov 22 || Los Angeles Kings || 3–6 || Pittsburgh Penguins || Civic Arena || 8–9–2 || 18
|- style="background:#cfc;"
| 20 || Nov 26 || Detroit Red Wings || 2–5 || Pittsburgh Penguins || Civic Arena || 9–9–2 || 20
|- style="background:#cfc;"
| 21 || Nov 29 || New York Rangers || 3–8 || Pittsburgh Penguins || Civic Arena || 10–9–2 || 22
|- style="background:#fcf;"
| 22 || Nov 30 || Pittsburgh Penguins || 2–4 || Boston Bruins || Boston Garden || 10–10–2 || 22
|-

|- style="background:#ffc;"
| 23 || Dec 3 || Pittsburgh Penguins || 3–3 || Chicago Black Hawks || Chicago Stadium || 10–10–3 || 23
|- style="background:#fcf;"
| 24 || Dec 4 || Pittsburgh Penguins || 1–6 || New York Islanders || Nassau Veterans Memorial Coliseum || 10–11–3 || 23
|- style="background:#cfc;"
| 25 || Dec 7 || Toronto Maple Leafs || 3–6 || Pittsburgh Penguins || Civic Arena || 11–11–3 || 25
|- style="background:#fcf;"
| 26 || Dec 9 || Pittsburgh Penguins || 2–3 || Kansas City Scouts || Kemper Arena || 11–12–3 || 25
|- style="background:#fcf;"
| 27 || Dec 10 || Pittsburgh Penguins || 2–3 || Detroit Red Wings || Olympia Stadium || 11–13–3 || 25
|- style="background:#ffc;"
| 28 || Dec 13 || Boston Bruins || 4–4 || Pittsburgh Penguins || Civic Arena || 11–13–4 || 26
|- style="background:#fcf;"
| 29 || Dec 14 || Pittsburgh Penguins || 4–7 || Montreal Canadiens || Montreal Forum || 11–14–4 || 26
|- style="background:#cfc;"
| 30 || Dec 17 || Pittsburgh Penguins || 9–2 || California Golden Seals || Oakland Coliseum Arena || 12–14–4 || 28
|- style="background:#fcf;"
| 31 || Dec 19 || Pittsburgh Penguins || 1–5 || Vancouver Canucks || Pacific Coliseum || 12–15–4 || 28
|- style="background:#cfc;"
| 32 || Dec 20 || Pittsburgh Penguins || 5–1 || Los Angeles Kings || The Forum || 13–15–4 || 30
|- style="background:#fcf;"
| 33 || Dec 23 || Pittsburgh Penguins || 3–4 || New York Rangers || Madison Square Garden (IV) || 13–16–4 || 30
|- style="background:#fcf;"
| 34 || Dec 26 || Pittsburgh Penguins || 3–4 || Atlanta Flames || Omni Coliseum || 13–17–4 || 30
|- style="background:#cfc;"
| 35 || Dec 27 || Atlanta Flames || 2–3 || Pittsburgh Penguins || Civic Arena || 14–17–4 || 32
|- style="background:#cfc;"
| 36 || Dec 31 || Los Angeles Kings || 1–5 || Pittsburgh Penguins || Civic Arena || 15–17–4 || 34
|-

|- style="background:#fcf;"
| 37 || Jan 3 || Philadelphia Flyers || 8–4 || Pittsburgh Penguins || Civic Arena || 15–18–4 || 34
|- style="background:#fcf;"
| 38 || Jan 4 || Pittsburgh Penguins || 3–5 || Chicago Black Hawks || Chicago Stadium || 15–19–4 || 34
|- style="background:#fcf;"
| 39 || Jan 7 || Pittsburgh Penguins || 1–4 || California Golden Seals || Oakland Coliseum Arena || 15–20–4 || 34
|- style="background:#ffc;"
| 40 || Jan 10 || Vancouver Canucks || 3–3 || Pittsburgh Penguins || Civic Arena || 15–20–5 || 35
|- style="background:#fcf;"
| 41 || Jan 11 || Pittsburgh Penguins || 0–6 || Buffalo Sabres || Buffalo Memorial Auditorium || 15–21–5 || 35
|- style="background:#fcf;"
| 42 || Jan 13 || Pittsburgh Penguins || 2–6 || Boston Bruins || Boston Garden || 15–22–5 || 35
|- style="background:#fcf;"
| 43 || Jan 15 || Pittsburgh Penguins || 1–4 || Philadelphia Flyers || The Spectrum || 15–23–5 || 35
|- style="background:#cfc;"
| 44 || Jan 17 || Buffalo Sabres || 2–3 || Pittsburgh Penguins || Civic Arena || 16–23–5 || 37
|- style="background:#cfc;"
| 45 || Jan 18 || New York Rangers || 3–8 || Pittsburgh Penguins || Civic Arena || 17–23–5 || 39
|- style="background:#fcf;"
| 46 || Jan 22 || Montreal Canadiens || 4–3 || Pittsburgh Penguins || Civic Arena || 17–24–5 || 39
|- style="background:#cfc;"
| 47 || Jan 24 || Washington Capitals || 2–8 || Pittsburgh Penguins || Civic Arena || 18–24–5 || 41
|- style="background:#ffc;"
| 48 || Jan 25 || Minnesota North Stars || 1–1 || Pittsburgh Penguins || Civic Arena || 18–24–6 || 42
|- style="background:#cfc;"
| 49 || Jan 29 || Kansas City Scouts || 2–6 || Pittsburgh Penguins || Civic Arena || 19–24–6 || 44
|- style="background:#ffc;"
| 50 || Jan 31 || Pittsburgh Penguins || 4–4 || Kansas City Scouts || Kemper Arena || 19–24–7 || 45
|-

|- style="background:#cfc;"
| 51 || Feb 1 || Toronto Maple Leafs || 1–7 || Pittsburgh Penguins || Civic Arena || 20–24–7 || 47
|- style="background:#fcf;"
| 52 || Feb 5 || Pittsburgh Penguins || 1–5 || Boston Bruins || Boston Garden || 20–25–7 || 47
|- style="background:#cfc;"
| 53 || Feb 7 || Pittsburgh Penguins || 7–3 || Los Angeles Kings || The Forum || 21–25–7 || 49
|- style="background:#cfc;"
| 54 || Feb 8 || Pittsburgh Penguins || 7–3 || Vancouver Canucks || Pacific Coliseum || 22–25–7 || 51
|- style="background:#ffc;"
| 55 || Feb 11 || Pittsburgh Penguins || 4–4 || California Golden Seals || Oakland Coliseum Arena || 22–25–8 || 52
|- style="background:#ffc;"
| 56 || Feb 14 || Pittsburgh Penguins || 4–4 || New York Islanders || Nassau Veterans Memorial Coliseum || 22–25–9 || 53
|- style="background:#cfc;"
| 57 || Feb 15 || Los Angeles Kings || 4–6 || Pittsburgh Penguins || Civic Arena || 23–25–9 || 55
|- style="background:#cfc;"
| 58 || Feb 17 || Kansas City Scouts || 1–6 || Pittsburgh Penguins || Civic Arena || 24–25–9 || 57
|- style="background:#cfc;"
| 59 || Feb 19 || Toronto Maple Leafs || 5–7 || Pittsburgh Penguins || Civic Arena || 25–25–9 || 59
|- style="background:#cfc;"
| 60 || Feb 21 || Chicago Black Hawks || 1–10 || Pittsburgh Penguins || Civic Arena || 26–25–9 || 61
|- style="background:#ffc;"
| 61 || Feb 22 || Pittsburgh Penguins || 2–2 || Detroit Red Wings || Olympia Stadium || 26–25–10 || 62
|- style="background:#ffc;"
| 62 || Feb 25 || Atlanta Flames || 3–3 || Pittsburgh Penguins || Civic Arena || 26–25–11 || 63
|- style="background:#cfc;"
| 63 || Feb 28 || Vancouver Canucks || 4–5 || Pittsburgh Penguins || Civic Arena || 27–25–11 || 65
|- style="background:#fcf;"
| 64 || Feb 29 || St. Louis Blues || 5–3 || Pittsburgh Penguins || Civic Arena || 27–26–11 || 65
|-

|- style="background:#cfc;"
| 65 || Mar 2 || Pittsburgh Penguins || 6–2 || Minnesota North Stars || Met Center || 28–26–11 || 67
|- style="background:#cfc;"
| 66 || Mar 6 || Minnesota North Stars || 0–5 || Pittsburgh Penguins || Civic Arena || 29–26–11 || 69
|- style="background:#fcf;"
| 67 || Mar 7 || New York Islanders || 5–3 || Pittsburgh Penguins || Civic Arena || 29–27–11 || 69
|- style="background:#fcf;"
| 68 || Mar 10 || Buffalo Sabres || 7–6 || Pittsburgh Penguins || Civic Arena || 29–28–11 || 69
|- style="background:#cfc;"
| 69 || Mar 13 || California Golden Seals || 2–4 || Pittsburgh Penguins || Civic Arena || 30–28–11 || 71
|- style="background:#cfc;"
| 70 || Mar 14 || St. Louis Blues || 1–7 || Pittsburgh Penguins || Civic Arena || 31–28–11 || 73
|- style="background:#fcf;"
| 71 || Mar 16 || Pittsburgh Penguins || 4–5 || Montreal Canadiens || Montreal Forum || 31–29–11 || 73
|- style="background:#cfc;"
| 72 || Mar 19 || Pittsburgh Penguins || 7–3 || Washington Capitals || Capital Centre || 32–29–11 || 75
|- style="background:#cfc;"
| 73 || Mar 21 || Pittsburgh Penguins || 4–2 || New York Rangers || Madison Square Garden (IV) || 33–29–11 || 77
|- style="background:#ffc;"
| 74 || Mar 24 || Boston Bruins || 5–5 || Pittsburgh Penguins || Civic Arena || 33–29–12 || 78
|- style="background:#fcf;"
| 75 || Mar 25 || Pittsburgh Penguins || 2–5 || St. Louis Blues || St. Louis Arena || 33–30–12 || 78
|- style="background:#cfc;"
| 76 || Mar 28 || Detroit Red Wings || 0–3 || Pittsburgh Penguins || Civic Arena || 34–30–12 || 80
|- style="background:#fcf;"
| 77 || Mar 29 || Pittsburgh Penguins || 4–5 || Toronto Maple Leafs || Maple Leaf Gardens || 34–31–12 || 80
|- style="background:#fcf;"
| 78 || Mar 31 || Pittsburgh Penguins || 3–7 || Montreal Canadiens || Montreal Forum || 34–32–12 || 80
|-

|- style="background:#fcf;"
| 79 || Apr 3 || Washington Capitals || 5–4 || Pittsburgh Penguins || Civic Arena || 34–33–12 || 80
|- style="background:#cfc;"
| 80 || Apr 4 || Pittsburgh Penguins || 6–5 || Detroit Red Wings || Olympia Stadium || 35–33–12 || 82
|-

|- style="text-align:center;"
| Legend:       = Win       = Loss       = Tie

Playoffs
The Penguins' made the playoffs for the fourth time in their history, losing in the preliminary round to Toronto.

Player statistics
Skaters

Goaltenders

†Denotes player spent time with another team before joining the Penguins.  Stats reflect time with the Penguins only.
‡Denotes player was traded mid-season.  Stats reflect time with the Penguins only.

Awards and records
 Jean Pronovost became the first player to score 200 goals for the Penguins. He did so in a 4–5 loss to Montreal on November 13.
 Jean Pronovost became the first player to score 400 points for the Penguins. He did so in a 5–2 win over Detroit on November 26.
 Jean Pronovost became the first person to score 50 goals in a season for the Penguins. He did so in a 5–5 tie with Boston on March 24.
 Pierre Larouche became the first person to score 100 points in a season for the Penguins. He did so in a 5–5 tie with Boston on March 24.
 Pierre Larouche established a new franchise record for goals in a season with 53, besting the previous high of 52 held by Jean Pronovost.
 Pierre Larouche established a new franchise record for points in a season with 111, besting the previous high of 86 held by Ron Schock.
 Syl Apps, Jr. established a new franchise record for assists in a season with 67, besting the previous high of 63 held by Ron Schock.
 Ron Stackhouse established a new franchise record for assists (60) and points (71) by a defenseman in a season. He topped the previous highs of 45 assists 60 points both held by himself.
 Ron Stackhouse established a new franchise record for points by a defenseman with 150, besting the previous high of 104 held by Duane Rupp.

Transactions
The Penguins were involved in the following transactions during the 1975–76 season:

Trades

Additions and subtractions

Awards and honors

Draft picks 

The 1975 NHL Amateur Draft was held in Montreal, Quebec.

References
 Penguins on Hockey Database
 

Pittsburgh Penguins seasons
Pittsburgh
Pittsburgh
Pitts
Pitts